Alexandre Mohbat (born May 16, 1995 in Beirut) is an alpine skier from Lebanon. He competed for Lebanon at the 2014 Winter Olympics in the slalom and giant slalom.

He competed at the 2012 Winter Youth Olympics in Innsbruck where his best result was 28th position in the boys' slalom race. Mohbat has also skied collegiately at Saint Michael's College in Colchester, Vermont.

See also
Lebanon at the 2014 Winter Olympics

References

1995 births
Living people
Lebanese male alpine skiers
Olympic alpine skiers of Lebanon
Alpine skiers at the 2014 Winter Olympics
Sportspeople from Beirut
Alpine skiers at the 2012 Winter Youth Olympics